Vitali Vladimirovich Papadopulo (born February 19, 1963 (in other sources  - July 13, 1963)) is a Russian professional football coach and a former player. As of 2009, he works as an administrator with FC Bataysk-2007.

External links
Profile at Footballfacts.ru

1963 births
Living people
Soviet footballers
Soviet expatriate footballers
Russian footballers
Russian Premier League players
Russian expatriate footballers
Expatriate footballers in Finland
Expatriate footballers in Ukraine
Expatriate footballers in Greece
FC SKA Rostov-on-Don players
FC Rostov players
FC APK Morozovsk players
FC Lokomotiv Nizhny Novgorod players
Panionios F.C. players
Association football forwards
Association football midfielders